Malubianbian is a Chinese hot pot chain. The company's headquarters is in Chengdu, Sichuan.

It was established in 2016. By 2021 the number of locations both in and outside China exceeded 1,000.

It opened its Los Angeles location in November 2019.

By 2021 it established its location in Houston. The decor of the Houston location is intended to give the imagery of street food establishments in Chengdu.

References

External links
 Malubiabian 

Restaurants in China
Chengdu